Holiday Club is a Finnish company of resort hotels and condominiums. It was founded in Finland in 1986 as Finska semesterbörsen (Swedish for "Finnish holiday exchange").

The first Holiday Club in Sweden opened in 2004 and is located in Åre.

Holiday Club also has hotels in Spain, in the Costa del Sol and Gran Canaria.

The CEO of Holiday Club is Maisa Romanainen.

External links
 
 
 

Travel and holiday companies of Finland
Hotels established in 1986
Condo hotels
1986 establishments in Finland